Trevose station is a station along the SEPTA West Trenton Line to Ewing, New Jersey. It is located at Ridge and Boundbrook Avenues in Bensalem Township, Pennsylvania. The station has off-street parking and a handicapped-accessible platform, however SEPTA has recently announced that they've expanded the number of parking spaces to 219. In FY 2013, Trevose station had a weekday average of 283 boardings and 275 alightings.

The previous station depot at Trevose was built in 1888 by the Philadelphia & Reading Railroad. The former station house was torn down in March 1970 and replaced with a small shelter to protect commuters from the elements.

Station layout
Trevose has two low-level side platforms with a mini high-level platform.

References

External links
SEPTA - Trevose Station
Original Trevose Station House (Existing RR Stations in Bucks County, Pennsylvania)

SEPTA Regional Rail stations
Former Reading Company stations
Railway stations in Bucks County, Pennsylvania